Joannes Baptista Sproll (2 October 1870 – 4 March 1949) was a German bishop and prominent opponent of the Nazi regime.

Sproll was born in Schweinhausen, near Biberach, the son of a street mender, Josef Sproll, and his wife, Anna Maria née Freuer. He attended the Latin school in Biberach and the Gymnasium Ehingen. He studied Catholic theology at the University of Tübingen from 1890 to 1894. In 1898, he received his Ph.D. for his work on the history of the law and constitution of the Tübingen monastery of St. George. On 14 June 1927 he became the Bishop of Rottenburg.

During the Nazi era, Sproll often spoke out against the regime, and his abstention from the plebiscite over the Anschluss led to preliminary proceedings and staged demonstrations against him. At the end of August 1938, Sproll was expelled from his diocese and could not return again until 1945. On 1 August 1940 Conrad Gröber, Archbishop of Freiburg, and the Vicar General of the Diocese of Rottenburg (acting for Sproll) protested against the euthanasia programmes in Grafeneck; this was also the year of the protest of the Bishop of Münster, Clemens August Graf von Galen. Sproll died in 1949 in Rottenburg am Neckar.

References
 

1870 births
1949 deaths
People from Biberach (district)
Roman Catholic bishops of Rottenburg
Members of the Württembergian Chamber of Lords